Elliot Tyson (born November 20, 1952) is an American sound engineer. He won an Academy Award for Best Sound and has been nominated for three more in the same category. He has worked on more than 160 films since 1979.

Selected filmography
Tyson won an Academy Award for Best Sound and has been nominated for another three:

Won
 Glory (1989)

Nominated
 Mississippi Burning (1988)
 The Shawshank Redemption (1994)
 The Green Mile (1999)

References

External links

1952 births
Living people
American audio engineers
Best Sound Mixing Academy Award winners
Best Sound BAFTA Award winners
Engineers from California
People from Santa Monica, California